The 2015–16 season was Alashkert's fourth season in the Armenian Premier League and 9th overall. It was their second season under the management of Abraham Khashmanyan, and they ended the season as champions of the Armenian Premier League for the first time, reached the Semifinals of the Armenian Cup and the second qualifying round of the UEFA Europa League.

Season events
On 2 July, Alashkert played in their first ever UEFA competition, taking on Scottish side St Johnstone in the first qualifying round of the 2015–16 UEFA Europa League. A goal on the hour from Mihran Manasyan was enough to ensure Alashkert's first win in the competition. The following week, Alashkert traveled to McDiarmid Park for the second leg, where a 73rd-minute goal from Norayr Gyozalyan gave Alashkert a vital away goal, as they lost the game 2–1, but progressed to the second qualifying round on the Away goals rule. In the second qualifying round, Alashkert faced FC Kairat from Kazakhstan, losing the first leg of the tie 3–0 in Almaty. In the second leg, goals from Ararat Arakelyan and Héber saw Alashkert win the game 2–1, but eliminated from the competition with a 2–4 aggregate defeat.

On 18 August, Artak Yedigaryan signed a one-year contract with Alashkert.

In January 2016, Alashkert announced the signing of Richard Cardozo from Maltese club Naxxar Lions.

In February 2016, Alashkert signed Artur Yedigaryan to a two-year contract after he'd left Dinamo Minsk.

Squad

Transfers

In

Loans in

Released

Competitions

Premier League

Results summary

Results

Table

Armenian Cup

UEFA Europa League

Qualifying rounds

Statistics

Appearances and goals

|-
|colspan="16"|Players who left Alashkert during the season:

|}

Goal scorers

Clean sheets

Disciplinary Record

References

FC Alashkert seasons
Alashkert
Alashkert